The Phoenix Cluster (SPT-CL J2344-4243) is a massive, Abell class type I galaxy cluster located at its namesake, southern constellation of Phoenix. It was initially detected in 2010 during a 2,500 square degree survey of the southern sky using the Sunyaev–Zel'dovich effect by the South Pole Telescope collaboration. It is one of the most massive galaxy clusters known, with the mass on the order of 2 , and is the most luminous X-ray cluster discovered, producing more X-rays than any other known massive cluster. It is located at a comoving distance of 8.57 billion light-years from Earth. About 42 member galaxies were identified and currently listed in the SIMBAD Astronomical Database, though the real number may be as high as 1,000.

Discovery

The Phoenix Cluster has first been reported by a paper by R. Williamson and colleagues during a survey by the South Pole Telescope in Antarctica, being one of the 26 galaxy clusters identified by the survey. The detection has been conducted at frequencies between 95, 150, and 220 GHz, with 14 of the galaxy clusters detected have been previously identified, while 12 – including Phoenix Cluster, being new discoveries. The would-be named Phoenix Cluster (still identified by its numerical catalogue entry SPT-CL J2344–4243) has been remarked to be having "the largest X-ray luminosity of any cluster" described by the survey.  A bright, type-2 Seyfert galaxy has also been pronounced lying 19 arcseconds from the apparent center of the cluster that has been identified as 2MASX J23444387-4243124, which would later be named Phoenix A, the cluster's central galaxy.

Characteristics

Due to its extreme properties, the Phoenix Cluster has been extensively studied and is considered one of the most important class of objects of its type. This measurement is one of the highest ever seen in the middle of a galaxy cluster. The very strong cooling flow in contrast to other galaxy clusters has been suggested to be a result of the feedback mechanism to prevent runaway cooling flow may not yet be established yet in the Phoenix Cluster; the heating mechanism expected to be produced by the central black hole being inadequate to create a feedback (in contrast to the Perseus and Virgo clusters).

Components

Central galaxy

The central elliptical cD galaxy of this cluster, Phoenix A, hosts an active galactic nucleus that has been described as sharing both the properties of being a quasar and a type 2 Seyfert galaxy, which is powered by a central supermassive black hole. The galaxy has yet an uncertain morphology. 

Phoenix A also contains vast amounts of hot gas. More normal matter is present there than the total of all the other galaxies in the cluster. Data from observations indicate that hot gas is cooling in the central regions at a rate of 3,820 solar masses per year, the highest ever recorded.

It is also undergoing a massive starburst, the highest recorded in the middle of a galaxy cluster, although other galaxies at higher redshifts have a higher starburst rate. (see Baby Boom Galaxy)

This is considerably higher than that of NGC 1275 A, the central galaxy of the Perseus Cluster, where stars are formed at a rate around 20 times lower, or the one per year rate of star formation in the Milky Way.

Supermassive black hole

The central black hole of the Phoenix Cluster is the engine that drives both the Seyfert nucleus of Phoenix A, as well as the relativistic jets that produce the inner cavities in the cluster center. M. Brockamp and colleagues had used a modelling of the innermost stellar density of the central galaxy and the adiabatic process that fuels the growth of its central black hole to create a calorimetric tool to measure the black hole's mass. The team deduced an energy conversion parameter and related it to the behavior of the hot intracluster gas, the AGN feedback parameter, and the dynamics and density profiles of the galaxy to create an evolutionary modelling of how the central black hole may have grown in the past. In the case of Phoenix A, it has been shown to have far more extreme characteristics, with adiabatic models near the theoretical limitations.

These models, as suggested by the paper, are indicative of a central black hole with estimated mass on the order of 100 billion , possibly even exceeding this mass, though the black hole's mass itself has not yet been measured through orbital mechanics. Such a high mass makes it one of the most massive black holes known in the universe. A black hole of this mass has:

 24,100 times the mass of the black hole at the center of the Milky Way (Sagittarius A*)
 twice the mass of the Triangulum Galaxy, including its dark matter halo.
 a circumference that would take 71 days and 14 hours to travel at light speed. 

Such a high mass may place it into a proposed category of stupendously large black holes (SLABs), black holes that may have been seeded by primordial black holes with masses that may reach  or more, larger than the upper maximum limit for at least luminous accreting black holes hosted by disc galaxies of about  The central black hole is devouring matter and growing at a rate of 60  every year.

References

External links
Animation of the Phoenix Cluster
 Chandra X-Ray Observatory, Blog Home: Q&A With Michael McDonald Wed, 08/08/2012 – 16:13
 The Prediction and Fulfillment of the "Effect": An Interview with Rashid Sunyaev, August 15, 2012

Galaxy clusters
Phoenix (constellation)
Astronomical objects discovered in 2010
Astronomical radio sources
Astronomical X-ray sources